Sosnovka is a rural locality (a village) in Styopantsevskoye Rural Settlement, Vyaznikovsky District, Vladimir Oblast, Russia. The population was 3 as of 2010.

Geography 
Sosnovka is located 30 km west of Vyazniki (the district's administrative centre) by road. Ryabikha is the nearest rural locality.

References 

Rural localities in Vyaznikovsky District